Quşlar (also, Kushlar) is a village and municipality in the Qabala Rayon of Azerbaijan.  It has a population of 797.

References 

Populated places in Qabala District